The tradition and style of garden design represented by Persian gardens or Iranian gardens, an example of the paradise garden, has influenced the design of gardens from Andalusia to India and beyond. The gardens of the Alhambra show the influence of Persian garden philosophy and style in a Moorish palace scale, from the era of al-Andalus in Spain. Humayun's Tomb and the Taj Mahal have some of the largest Persian gardens in the world, from the era of the Mughal Empire in India.

Concept and etymology

From the time of the Achaemenid Empire, the idea of an earthly paradise spread through Persian literature and example to other cultures, both the Hellenistic gardens of the Seleucid Empire and the Ptolemies in Alexandria. The Avestan word pairidaēza-, Old Persian *paridaida-, Median *paridaiza- (walled-around, i.e., a walled garden), was borrowed into Akkadian, and then into Greek , then rendered into the Latin paradīsus, and from there entered into European languages, e.g., French paradis, German Paradies, and English paradise.

As the word expresses, such gardens would have been enclosed. The garden's purpose was, and is, to provide a place for protected relaxation in a variety of manners: spiritual, and leisurely (such as meetings with friends), essentially a paradise on earth. The Common Iranian word for "enclosed space" was *pari-daiza- (Avestan pairi-daēza-), a term that was adopted by Christian mythology to describe the garden of Eden or Paradise on earth.

The garden's construction may be formal (with an emphasis on structure) or casual (with an emphasis on nature), following several simple design rules. This allows maximisation, in terms of function and emotion, of what may be done in the garden.

History

Persian gardens may originate as early as 4000 BC, but it is clear that this  tradition began with the Achaemenid dynasty around the 6th century BCE. Decorated pottery of that time displays the typical cross plan of the Persian garden. The outline of Pasargadae, built around 500 BC, is still viewable today. Classical Iranians were seen by the Greeks as the 'great gardeners' of antiquity; Cyrus II (known also as Cyrus the Younger) is alleged to have told the Spartan commander Lysander that he gardened daily when not campaigning, and had himself laid out the park at Sardis, which he called his 'paradise' (a Greek corruption of the Old Persian word for garden). 

During the suzerainty of the Sasanian Empire, under the influence of Zoroastrianism, water in art grew increasingly important. This trend manifested itself in garden design, with greater emphasis on fountains and ponds in gardens.

During the Umayyad and Abbasid periods, the aesthetic aspect of the garden increased in importance, overtaking utility. During this time, aesthetic rules that govern the garden grew in importance. An example of this is the chahār bāgh, a form of garden that attempts to emulate the Abrahamic notion of a Garden of Eden, with four rivers and four quadrants that represent the world. The design sometimes extends one axis longer than the cross-axis and may feature water channels that run through each of the four gardens and connect to a central pool.

Under the Abbasid dynasty (8th century AD), this type of garden became an integral part of representational architecture.
The Persian garden is a landscape garden, designed individually and created intentionally as a space embedded in the aesthetic and spiritual context of its past and contemporary cultural, political, and social environment. Hallmarks of these formal gardens are a geometric layout following geometric and visual principles, implemented to nature by water channels and basins which divide the enclosed space into clearly defined quarters, a principle that has become known as Chahar Bagh (four gardens), waterworks with channels, basins, fountains and cascades, pavilions, prominent central axes with a vista, and a plantation with a variety of carefully chosen trees, herbs. and flowers. The old-Iranian word for such gardens "pari-daizi' expresses the notion of an earthly paradise that is inherent to them. As such, they are a metaphor for the divine order and the unification and protection of the ones who do good. Their counterparts on earth fulfill a similar function. These principles are brought to perfection in the gardens of the emperor as the "good gardener".
Notwithstanding a formal standardization, the landscape gardens also reflect diversity and development, bound to function, regional and chronological characteristics, as well as technological, know how personal preferences, ambitions, and demands. Persian gardens are multi-functional: they not only serve contemplation and relaxation, but are also a representation and manifestation of power. Designing and implementing a garden demonstrates the occupation of land, holding audiences and celebrating victories or marriages in these gardens signal superiority, or social and political bonds. Starting from the 12th to 13th century, tombs for members of the royal family or important personalities were placed into such formal gardens, providing believers a chance to benefit from the spirituality of a venerated person and the particular aura of the garden.

The invasion of Persia by the Mongols in the thirteenth century led to a new emphasis on highly ornate structure in the garden. Examples of this include tree peonies and chrysanthemums. The Mongols then carried a Persian garden tradition to other parts of their empire (notably India).

The Mughal emperor Babur introduced the Persian garden to India, attempting to replicate the cool, refreshing aura of his homeland in the Ferghana Valley through the construction of Persian-style gardens, like those at other Timurid cities like Samarkand and Herat. Babur was a zealous gardener and personally designed and supervised at least ten gardens in his capital of Kabul in modern Afghanistan, such as the Bagh-e Babur, where he recorded the allure of the pomegranate, cherry and orange trees he had planted. Though his empire soon expanded as far as north-central India, he abhorred the stagnant heat and drab environment of the hot, dusty plains of India; he was thus interred at Bagh-e Babur in Kabul by his widow in 1544.

The Aram Bagh of Agra was the first of many Persian gardens he created in India itself. Mughal gardens have four basic requirements, symbolizing four allegorical essentials for the afterlife: shade, fruit, fragrance and running water, and this pattern was used to build many Persian gardens throughout the Indian subcontinent, such as the Shalimar Gardens of Lahore, the Shalimar Bagh and Nishat Bagh of Kashmir, and the Taj Mahal gardens. The Taj Mahal gardens embody the Persian concept of an ideal paradise garden, and were built with irrigation channels and canals from the Yamuna River. These gardens have recently been restored to their former beauty after decades of pollution by the Indian authorities, who cut down the fruit- and shade-bearing vegetation of the garden.

The Safavid dynasty (seventeenth to eighteenth century) built and developed grand and epic layouts that went beyond a simple extension to a palace and became an integral aesthetic and functional part of it. In the following centuries, European garden design began to influence Persia, particularly the designs of France, and secondarily that of Russia and the United Kingdom. Western influences led to changes in the use of water and the species used in bedding.

Traditional forms and style are still applied in modern Iranian gardens. They also appear in historic sites, museums and affixed to the houses of the rich.

Elements of the Persian garden

Sunlight and its effects were an important factor of structural design in Persian gardens. Textures and shapes were specifically chosen by architects to harness the light.

Iran's dry heat makes shade important in gardens, which would be nearly unusable without it. Trees and trellises largely feature as biotic shade; pavilions and walls are also structurally prominent in blocking the sun.

The heat also makes water important, both in the design and maintenance of the garden. Irrigation may be required, and may be provided via a form of tunnel called a qanat, that transports water from a local aquifer. Well-like structures then connect to the qanat, enabling the drawing of water. Alternatively, an animal-driven Persian well would draw water to the surface. Such wheel systems also moved water around surface water systems, such as those in the chahar bāgh style. Trees were often planted in a ditch called a juy, which prevented water evaporation and allowed the water quick access to the tree roots.

The Persian style often attempts to integrate indoors with outdoors through the connection of a surrounding garden with an inner courtyard. Designers often place architectural elements such as vaulted arches between the outer and interior areas to open up the divide between them.

Descriptions

An early description (from the first half of the fourth century BCE) of a Persian garden is found in Xenophon's Oeconomicus in which he has Socrates relate the story of the Spartan general Lysander's visit to the Persian prince Cyrus the Younger, who shows the Greek his "paradise at Sardis". In this story Lysander is "astonished at the beauty of the trees within, all planted at equal intervals, the long straight rows of waving branches, the perfect regularity, the rectangular  symmetry of the whole, and the many sweet scents which hung about them as they paced the park"

The oldest representational descriptions and illustrations of Persian gardens come from travelers who reached Iran from the west. These accounts include Ibn Battuta in the fourteenth century, Ruy González de Clavijo in the fifteenth century and Engelbert Kaempfer in the seventeenth century. Battuta and Clavijo made only passing references to gardens and did not describe their design, but Kaempfer made careful drawings and converted them into detailed engravings after his return to Europe. They show charbagh-type gardens that featured an enclosing wall, rectangular pools, an internal network of canals, garden pavilions and lush planting. There are surviving examples of this garden type at Yazd (Dowlatabad) and at Kashan (Fin Garden). The location of the gardens Kaempfer illustrated in Isfahan can be identified.

Styles
The six primary styles of the Persian garden may be seen in the following table, which puts them in the context of their function and style. Gardens are not limited to a particular style, but often integrate different styles, or have areas with different functions and styles.

Hayāt

Publicly, it is a classical Persian layout with heavy emphasis on aesthetics over function. Man-made structures in the garden are particularly important, with arches and pools (which may be used to bathe). The ground is often covered in gravel flagged with stone. Plantings are typically very simple - such as a line of trees, which also provide shade.

Privately, these gardens are often pool-centred and, again, structural. The pool serves as a focus and source of humidity for the surrounding atmosphere. There are few plants, often due to the limited water available in urban areas.

Meidān
This is a public, formal garden that puts more emphasis on the biotic element than the hayāt and that minimises structure. Plants range from trees, to shrubs, to bedding plants, to grasses. Again, there are elements such as a pool and gravel pathways which divide the lawn. When structures are used, they are often built, as in the case of pavilions, to provide shade.

Chahar Bāgh

These gardens are private and formal. The basic structure consists of four quadrants divided by waterways or pathways. Traditionally, the rich used such gardens in work-related functions (such as entertaining ambassadors). These gardens balance structure with greenery, with the plants often around the periphery of a pool and path based structure.

Boostān
Much like many other parks, the Persian park serves a casual public function with emphasis on plant life. They provide pathways and seating, but are otherwise usually limited in terms of structural elements. The purpose of such places is relaxation and socialisation.

Bāgh
Like the other casual garden, the park, bāgh emphasizes the natural and green aspect of the garden. Unlike the park it is a private area often affixed to houses and often consisting of lawns, trees, and ground plants. The waterways and pathways stand out less than in the more formal counterparts and are largely functional. The primary function of such areas is familial relaxation.

World Heritage Sites

Pasargad Garden at Pasargadae, Iran (WHS 1372-001)
Eram Garden, Shiraz, Iran (WHS 1372-002)
Chehel Sotoun, Isfahan, Iran (WHS 1372-003)
Fin Garden, Kashan, Iran (WHS 1372-004)
Abbasabad Garden, Abbasabad, Mazandaran, Iran (WHS 1372-005)
Shazdeh Garden, Mahan, Kerman Province, Iran (WHS 1372-006)
Dolatabad Garden, Yazd, Iran (WHS 1372-007)
Pahlevanpour Garden, Iran (WHS 1372-008)
Akbarieh Garden, South Khorasan Province, Iran (WHS 1372-009)
Taj Mahal, Agra, India (WHS 252)
Humayun's Tomb, New Delhi, India (WHS 232bis)
Shalimar Gardens, Lahore, Pakistan (WHS 171-002)
Generalife, Granada, Spain (WHS 314-001)

See also

 Delgosha Garden 
 El-Gölü
 Firdaws-i Bareen
 Mellat Park
 Paradise garden
 Persian architecture
 Persian Inscriptions on Indian Monuments
 List of Persian gardens in Iran

Notes

References

Further reading
 Dariush Borbor, "The Influence of Persian Gardens on Islamic Decoration", in Architecture Formes Fonctions / Architektur Form Funktion / Architecture Forms Functions / Arquitectura Formas Functiones vol. 14, Editions Anthony Krafft, Lausanne, 1968, pp. 84–91.
 ۳۳-۵۰ داریوش بوربور، «تاثیر باغ‌های ایرانی بر تزئینات ساختمانی اسلامی»، پل فیروزه (ویژه میراث فرهنگی معنوی)، سال ششم، شماره ۱۸، تهران، تابستان ۱۳۸۸، صص 
 Rostami, Raheleh., Hasanuddin, Lamit., Khoshnava, S. Meysam., Rostami, Rasoul (2014). "The Role of Historical Persian Gardens on the Health Status of Contemporary Urban Residents". Journal of EcoHealth, 11 (3), 308-321.
 Rostami, Raheleh., Hasanuddin, Lamit., Khoshnava, S. Meysam., Rostami, Rasoul (2015).Sustainable Cities and the Contribution of Historical Urban Green Spaces: A Case Study of Historical Persian Gardens, Journal of Sustainability, 7, 13290-13316.
 Rostami, Raheleh., Hasanuddin, Lamit., Khoshnava, S. Meysam., Rostami, Rasoul (2015). Successful Public Places, A case Study of Historical Persian Gardens, Journal of Urban Forestry & Urban Greening, In Press, doi:10.1016/j.ufug.2015.08.011 
 Rostami, Raheleh., Hasanuddin, Lamit., Khoshnava, S. Meysam., Rostami, Rasoul (2011). "Contribution of Historical Persian Gardens for Sustainable Urban and Environment: Lessons from Hot Arid Region of IRAN". American Transaction on Engineering and Applied Sciences 1(3), 281-294.
 Khonsari, Mehdi; Moghtader, M. Reza; Yavari, Minouch (1998). The Persian Garden: Echoes of Paradise. Mage Publishers. .
 
 Newton Wilber, D (1979). Persian Gardens and Garden Pavilions. Washington.
 Michel Conan, Dumbarton Oaks (2007). Middle East Garden Traditions: Unity and Diversity.

External links

Monty Don's Paradise Gardens (BBC documentary)
 Isfahan "Persian Garden Design" website. Retrieved 3 January 2012.
 Babur's Garden - video from the Asia Society, US
 Animated film inspired by the Persian Architecture
 Farnoush Tehrāni, The Meaning of the Persian Garden, in Persian, Jadid Online, 12 November 2009.
 Audio slideshow:  (5 min 58 sec).
 Farnoush Tehrāni, The Face of the Persian Garden, in Persian, 13 November 2009.
 Audio slideshow:  (6 min 16 sec).

 
Gardens
Architecture in Iran